Paddock is an English surname. Notable people with the surname include:

Algernon Paddock (1830–1897), American politician
Benjamin G. Paddock (1827-1900), American politician
Benjamin H. Paddock (1828-1886), American Episcopal bishop
Benjamin Hoskins Paddock (1926–1998), American bank robber and con man who was on the FBI Ten Most Wanted Fugitives list from 1969 to 1977
Cam Paddock (born 1983), Canadian ice hockey player
Charley Paddock (1900–1943), American athlete and actor
Daniel H. Paddock (1852–1905), American politician
Del Paddock (1887–1952), American baseball player
Francis Paddock (1814–1889), American frontier doctor
George A. Paddock (1885–1964), American politician
John Paddock (footballer) (1876–1965), British football player
John Paddock (born 1954), Canadian hockey coach
Ray Paddock (1877–1953), American politician and farmer
Richard B. Paddock (1859–1901), American cavalry officer
Stephen Paddock (1953–2017), American mass murderer, perpetrator of the 2017 Las Vegas shooting 
Tom Paddock (c. 1822–1863), British boxing champion
William Paddock (1832-1891), American politician

See also
Paddick